Clube de Futebol de Fão (abbreviated as CF Fão) is a Portuguese football club based in Fão, Esposende in the district of Braga.

Background
CF Fão currently plays in the Terceira Divisão Série A which is the fourth tier of Portuguese football. The club was founded in 1957 and they play their home matches at the Complexo Desportivo Clube de Futebol de Fão in Fão, Esposende. The stadium is able to accommodate 1,000 spectators.

The club is affiliated to Associação de Futebol de Braga and has competed in the AF Braga Taça. The club has also entered the national cup competition known as Taça de Portugal on a few occasions.

Season to season

Honours
AF Braga Divisão de Honra: 	1999/00, 2007/08

Footnotes

External links
Official website 

Football clubs in Portugal
Association football clubs established in 1957
1957 establishments in Portugal
Esposende